Yunnanilus sichuanensis is a species of ray-finned fish, a stone loach, in the genus Yunnanilus. It is endemic to Sichuan in China where the type locality is the Shuyalong Jiang River in the drainage of the Anning River in Mianning County.

References

S
Fish described in 1995